Swamp Island is an island of the Andaman Islands. It belongs to the North and Middle Andaman administrative district, part of the Indian union territory of Andaman and Nicobar Islands.

Geography
The island belongs to the Stewart Sound Group and lies west of Egg Island.

Administration
Politically, Swamp Island, along neighboring Stewart Sound Group Islands, belongs to Diglipur Taluk.

References 

 Geological Survey of India

Islands of North and Middle Andaman district
Uninhabited islands of India
Islands of India
Islands of the Bay of Bengal